Richard Martin Hutchings (born 6 May 1978) is an English cricketer. Hutchings is a right-handed batsman who plays primarily as a wicket-keeper. He was born in Leicester, Leicestershire.

Hutchings represented the Leicestershire Cricket Board in List A cricket. His debut List A match came against Hertfordshire in the 1999 NatWest Trophy. From 1999 to 2001, he represented the Board in four List A matches, the last of which came against the Kent Cricket Board in the 2nd round of the 2002 Cheltenham & Gloucester Trophy which was played in 2001.

In his 4 List A matches, he scored 28 runs at a batting average of 7.00, with a high score of 15. In the field he took 2 catches. Despite being able to play as a wicket-keeper, he did not keep wicket for the Board.

From 2004 to 2009, he played for Hinckley Town in the Leicestershire Premier League.

References

External links
Richard Hutchings at Cricinfo
Richard Hutchings at CricketArchive

1978 births
Living people
Cricketers from Leicester
English cricketers
Leicestershire Cricket Board cricketers
Wicket-keepers